An election to the County Council of London took place on 5 March 1910. It was the eighth triennial election of the whole Council. 
The size of the council was 118 councillors and 19 aldermen. The councillors were elected for electoral divisions corresponding to the parliamentary constituencies that had been created by the Representation of the People Act 1884. There were 57 dual member constituencies and one four member constituency. The council was elected by First Past the Post with each elector having two votes in the dual member seats.

National government background
The Prime Minister of the day was the Liberal H. H. Asquith who led a minority Liberal Government that relied upon the Irish Parliamentary Party for a majority. A General Election had taken place a couple of months earlier in January at which the Liberals had lost their overall majority. The Conservatives and Liberal Unionists formed the official opposition. The Labour Party was the fourth party and generally voted with the Liberals in parliament.

London Council background
The Municipal Reform party had been in power since winning a majority in 1907. It was now seeking its second mandate.

Candidates
All constituencies were contested. The governing Municipal Reform Party ran a full slate of 118 candidates. The opposition Progressive Party ran 110 candidates. They ran candidates everywhere except the City of London where they ran three candidates, Hampstead, St George's Hanover Square and Strand where only one candidate stood, three constituencies where one candidate ran in tandem with Labour and Woolwich where they did not oppose a Labour pair. Four Independents also ran.

Labour Party
The party fielded ten candidates, five of these candidates ran in tandem with Progressive candidates, a further two candidates were not opposed by Progressives. The other three all stood in opposition to Progressive candidates. The Labour Party in London had no elected or otherwise recognised Leader.

Outcome
The Municipal Reform Party was returned with its second successive majority. At the 1907 elections, they had an overall majority of 40. After that election they shared out the 9 vacant Aldermanic seats giving them an effective working majority of 43. At the 1910 elections, their overall majority was cut to just 2. After the election they decided to bolster their majority by giving themselves all 10 of the vacant Aldermanic seats. This gave them an effective working majority of 17. Two of their new Aldermanic appointments were people who had just been voted out by the electors.

Constituency results
Incumbent Councillors shown in bold.

Battersea and Clapham

Bethnal Green

Camberwell

Chelsea

City of London

Deptford

Finsbury

Fulham

Greenwich

Hackney

Hammersmith

Hampstead

Islington

Kensington

Lambeth

Lewisham

Marylebone

Newington

Paddington

St George's Hanover Square

St Pancras

Shoreditch

Southwark

Strand

Tower Hamlets

Wandsworth

Westminster

Woolwich

References

London County Council election
County Council election
1910
London County Council election